The AFC Club Competitions Ranking is a ranking system launched by the Asian Football Confederation (AFC) in 2014. The ranking is based on the results of teams participating in the last four years of the AFC Champions League and the AFC Cup. The ranking is used for determine slot allocation for the AFC member assocaitions in its club competitions.

Calculation principle

The Club Competitions Ranking (former Member Association Ranking, or MA ranking) is used to rank associations and also used for seeding teams in the competitions. It is also used to allocate the number of entries and entry points to the competitions. There are however many shifts each year with associations not meeting off field requirements.

Each team is awarded points based on their performance in AFC club competitions. Points of a country in a season consists of two parts. First is the points earned in group and knockout stages. The total of points earned by all clubs from the country will be divided by the number of participating clubs in that tournament (points from AFC Champions League teams and AFC Cup teams are counted and averaged separately, then added to each other). The second one is the points from qualifying stages. Points earned by all clubs from the country are added up. The sum of those two parts will be the country's points for the season.

The ranking consists of the total of points of member association's clubs over the past four year. The points of the leading team are made 100 points in percentage terms. All other associations are adjusted proportionally to the leading team.

Source:AFC

2021 ranking
To be used for allocating slots in the 2023–24 season, which is relevant for use in determining allocations for the following cycle of the AFC Champions League and AFC Cup.

Updated on 7 December 2021.

(Source)

2022 ranking

Old ranking system

New ranking structure
The AFC have announced changes in the format for ACL and AFC Cup, splitting into 3 competitions from 2024/25.

The structure has not yet been finalised, but will take into account the results from the past 8 years (with a yet to be determined weighting formula), and an additional retroactive re-calculation for the years affected by COVID-19 disruptions.

Club ranking
A club ranking was introduced in 2014 by the AFC. It was an informative ranking and not used to seed clubs in the club competitions.

See also
UEFA coefficient, a similar system used by UEFA
CAF 5-Year Ranking, a similar system used by the Confederation of African Football
CONMEBOL ranking of the Copa Libertadores, a similar system used by CONMEBOL (clubs only)

Notes

References

External links
Ranking at the-afc.com
Rankings at FootyRankings

Association football rankings
Asian Football Confederation competitions